Gopichand Parmanand Hinduja (Sindhi:گوپيچند پرمانند ھندوجا) (born 29 January 1940) is an Indian-born British billionaire businessman, the co-chairman of the Hinduja Group. As of May 2020, together with his brother Srichand he is the UK's second richest man. Since the 1990s, he has been consistently ranked among the UK and Asia's wealthiest people. In May 2017, Hinduja topped the Sunday Times Rich List with an estimated wealth of GBP 16.2 billion ($21 billion). Based on the rich list compiled by Asian Media & Marketing Group, Hinduja's wealth is estimated at GBP 19 billion ($24.7 billion). The Forbes List in March 2018 ranked him and his brother GP as the world's 55th richest billionaire family with an estimated wealth of $19.5 billion.

In May 2019 The Hinduja brothers, Gopichand and Srichand, were once again named by the Time UK as the UK's wealthiest people, according to the annual Rich List survey. In 2001, Hinduja was involved in the UK’s "cash-for-passports" scandal, where he donated money for the Millennium Dome while applying for British citizenship, leading to resignation of Peter Mandelson.

Early life
Gopichand Parmanand Hinduja was born on January 29, 1940, the son of Parmanand Hinduja, and educated at Jai Hind College, Bombay.

Personal life
He is married to Sunita Hinduja, and they have two sons and one daughter, Sanjay Hinduja, Dheeraj Hinduja and Rita Hinduja. The Hinduja family is of Sindhi heritage.

In 2015, their son Sanjay Hinduja married his long-time girlfriend, the designer Anu Mahtani, in Udaipur, India. The wedding cost £15 million and entertainment included the pop singers Jennifer Lopez, Arjun Kapoor and Nicole Scherzinger.

References

1940 births
British people of Indian descent
British billionaires
British businesspeople of Indian descent
Gopichand
Indian emigrants to the United Kingdom
Living people
British people of Sindhi descent